Lloyd Lislevand (born 28 October 1969) is a retired footballer who played as a midfielder for clubs in Norway, Greece and Cyprus.

Club career
Born in Vigeland, Lislevand began playing football with FK Vidar in the Norwegian second division. He would play for several other Norwegian clubs, including IK Start in the premier league and Randaberg IL and Fana IL in the first division.

Lislevand moved to Greece in July 1989, where he would play for Greek first division side OFI Crete. He made only five appearances in the Greek top flight, but would play in the Greek second division with Charavgiakos F.C., Anagennisi Karditsa F.C. and Niki Volos F.C., and in the Greek third division with Poseidon Michaniona, Olympiakos Chersonissos F.C. and Kassandra F.C.

He also had a spell in Cyprus with APEP F.C., Anagennisi Dherynia F.C. and Aris Limassol F.C.

References

External links
Norwegian football players abroad. L

1969 births
Living people
People from Lindesnes
Norwegian footballers
Norwegian expatriate footballers
FK Vidar players
Randaberg IL players
OFI Crete F.C. players
IK Start players
Fana IL players
A.O. Charavgiakos players
Anagennisi Karditsa F.C. players
APEP FC players
Anagennisi Deryneia FC players
Aris Limassol FC players
Niki Volos F.C. players
Hersonissos F.C. players
Kassandra F.C. players
Super League Greece players
Football League (Greece) players
Cypriot First Division players
Expatriate footballers in Greece
Norwegian expatriate sportspeople in Greece
Expatriate footballers in Cyprus
Norwegian expatriate sportspeople in Cyprus
Association football midfielders
Sportspeople from Agder